Tehuantepec is a 1954 Mexican historical drama film directed by Miguel Contreras Torres and starring Katy Jurado, Gustavo Rojo and Enrique Rambal. In the early twentieth century a railway is constructed across Tehuantepec to try and compete with the Panama Canal which was also under construction.

Cast
In alphabetical order
 Manuel Arvide 
 Victorio Blanco 
 Manuel Calvo 
 Eduardo Fajardo 
 Pedro Galván 
 Enrique García Álvarez
 Eduardo González Pliego 
 Gilberto González 
 Enrique Iñigo 
 Katy Jurado 
 José Muñoz 
 Manuel Noriega 
 Diana Ochoa 
 Polo Ortín 
 Consuelo Pastor 
 Ismael Pérez 
 Enrique Rambal  
 Tracey Roberts 
 Gustavo Rojo 
 Domingo Soler 
 Jorge Treviño

References

Bibliography 
 Quinlan, David. Quinlan's Film Stars. Batsford, 2000.

External links 
 

1954 films
1950s historical drama films
Mexican historical drama films
1950s Spanish-language films
Films directed by Miguel Contreras Torres
Films set in Mexico
Films set in the 1900s
Rail transport films
1954 drama films
Mexican black-and-white films
1950s Mexican films